= Evan Short =

Canadian engineer

- Occupation: Engineer
- Years active: 1999 -
- Known for: Formula One engineer

Evan Short (born 1973/1974) is a Canadian Formula One engineer. As of 2026, he works as the Trackside Electronics Leader for the Mercedes team.

== Career ==
Short studied at University of British Columbia in 1993–1998. While working as an electrical engineer for Formula UBC, a student team that builds a new formula-style race car each year for the university's annual design competition in Detroit. Short began his career in Formula 1 at Ferrari, where he worked as an electronics engineer from 1999 to 2007. He also held the position of Senior Control Systems Engineer at Honda and Brawn GP in 2008–2009. He also the Race Team Electronics Leader at Mercedes since February 2010.

== Personal life ==
Short has lived with his wife in England since 2008 and they have three children.
